Allocapnia is a genus of small winter stoneflies in the family Capniidae. There are at least 40 described species in Allocapnia.

Species

References

Further reading

 
 

Plecoptera